The  was a moderate leftist political party in early Shōwa period Empire of Japan.

The Shakai Taishūtō was founded by Abe Isoo in July 1932, as a merger of the Shakai Minshūtō (Socialist Mass Party) with the Zenkoku Rōnō Taishūtō (National Labour-Farmer Mass Party). In a period of increasing extremism in politics, the new party attempted to maintain a middle-of-the road approach which inevitably resulted in a confused policy.

On one hand, the Shakai Taishūtō supported agrarian reform and pushed for improvement in the lot of the farmers by cutting the military budget; on the other hand, it cultivated ties with the Tōseiha political faction within the Imperial Japanese Army, and supported Japanese aggression in Manchuria. The Shakai Taishūtō advocated increased international cooperation and opposed Japan's withdraw from the League of Nations, but at the same time supported the invasion of China in 1937.

It was the only leftist party allowed to function in the 1930s, and it emerged as the third-largest party in the Lower House of the Diet of Japan, with 36 seats after the 1937 General Election. The party received support from a wide cross-section of the electorate, including middle class shop owners resentful of the zaibatsu, salaried-workers, and some minor bureaucrats. However, the basic split within the Shakai Taishūtō internally between supporters of social democracy versus Nazism came to a head after the vote to expel Saitō Takao from the Diet arose after he sharply criticized the conduct of the Imperial Japanese Army and its actions on the Asian mainland. Members of the party who had abstained from the motion to purge Saitō were expelled for "unpatriotic sentiments", causing chairman Abe Isoo to resign as well. The remainder of the party grew increasingly nationalistic and militaristic, and was absorbed into the Imperial Rule Assistance Association in 1940.

Election results

References

Notes 

1932 establishments in Japan
Anti-capitalist political parties
Anti-communist organizations in Japan
Anti-fascist organizations
Centre-left parties in Asia
Defunct political parties in Japan
Political parties established in 1932
Political parties disestablished in 1940
Politics of the Empire of Japan
Shōwa Statism
Social democratic parties in Japan